The Husan Line is a non-electrified standard-gauge freight-only secondary line of the Korean State Railway located entirely within Namp'o Special City, South P'yŏngan Province, North Korea, running from Husan on the Ryonggang Line to Yangmak.

The Husan Line runs  along the west side of the Ryongho Reservoir to serve a number of industries around Yangmak. The industrial trackage continues for a ways beyond Yangmak to the Yangmak granite quarry.

History
The line was originally opened by the Chosen Government Railway prior to 1937.

Services
Most freight on the line is outbound from the granite quarry past Yangmak.

Route
A yellow background in the "Distance" box indicates that section of the line is not electrified.

References

Railway lines in North Korea
Standard gauge railways in North Korea